Piłsudski is a 2019 Polish biographical drama film directed and written by Michał Rosa.

Synopsis
In 1901, the Polish Socialist Party helps Józef Piłsudski escape from an asylum in Saint Petersburg. After his escape, Piłsudski devotes his life to achieving Polish independence.

Cast
Borys Szyc as Józef Piłsudski
Magdalena Boczarska as Maria Piłsudska
Jan Marczewski as Walery Sławek
Józef Pawłowski as Aleksander Sulkiewicz
Maria Dębska as Aleksandra Piłsudska
Eliza Rycembel as Wanda Piłsudska
Tomasz Schuchardt as Aleksander Prystor
Tomasz Borkowski as Józef Kwiatek
Filip Kosior as Tadeusz Kasprzycki
Kamil Szeptycki as Kazimierz Sosnkowski
Krzysztof Chodorowski as Władysław Mazurkiewicz
Hubert Kułacz as Tomasz Arciszewski

Filming
The filming took place in Kraków, Lublin, Zakopane, Zgierz, Łódź, Kasina Wielka, Tarnawa and Lubiąż. Lubiąż Abbey was used for filming Saint Petersburg psychiatric hospital scenes. The filming lasted from August 9 to  October 3 and from December 8 to December 14 in 2018.

Accolades

References

External links
 
 
 
Józef Piłsudski
2019 films
2010s Polish-language films
2010s Russian-language films
2019 multilingual films
Polish historical drama films
2010s historical drama films
Polish war drama films
Films set in 1901
Films set in 1914
Films set in Saint Petersburg
Films set in Poland
Films shot in Poland
Films set in Kraków
Films shot in Kraków
Films set in Russia
Films directed by Michal Rosa